Börje Ekedahl (August 21, 1928 – January 5, 2006) was a Swedish bobsledder who competed in the early 1950s. He finished seventh in the four-man event at the 1952 Winter Olympics in Oslo.

References
Bobsleigh four-man result: 1948-64
Wallenchinsky, David (1984). "Bobsled: Four-man". In The Complete Book of the Olympics: 1896-1980. New York: Penguin Books. p. 561.

1928 births
2006 deaths
Swedish male bobsledders
Olympic bobsledders of Sweden
Bobsledders at the 1952 Winter Olympics
20th-century Swedish people